Daniele Martinelli (born 27 February 1982) is an Italian football defender.

On 10 July 2014 Martinelli and Richard Gabriel Marcone were signed by Trapani outright.

References

External links

FIGC 

1982 births
Footballers from Turin
Living people
Italian footballers
Italy youth international footballers
Association football defenders
Torino F.C. players
A.C.N. Siena 1904 players
Ternana Calcio players
L.R. Vicenza players
Trapani Calcio players
Bassano Virtus 55 S.T. players
Serie A players
Serie B players
Serie C players